Măru may refer to several places in Romania:

 Măru, a village in Zăvoi Commune, Caraș-Severin County
 Măru, a village in Logrești Commune, Gorj County
 Pârâul Mărului, a river in Vrancea County

See also 
 Măru Roșu (disambiguation), the name of several villages in Romania
 Maru (disambiguation)
 Merești (disambiguation)
 Merișor (disambiguation)
 Merișoru (disambiguation)
 Merișani (disambiguation)
 Poiana Mărului (disambiguation)
 Valea Mărului (disambiguation)